Mats Scheidegger (born 1963 in Baden, Switzerland) is a classical guitarist. He specializes in contemporary music, e.g. he is the dedicatee of Sam Hayden's Sam Hayden AXE(S) (info). He has given numerous premieres of contemporary works.

He has been artistic director of the "Tage für Neue Musik Zürich" festival since 1998. He did many recordings for Labels such as Grammont, NMC-Records, Harmonia Mundi.

References

External links
Biography
Biography
Tage für Neue Musik Zürich

Swiss classical guitarists
1963 births
Living people
Date of birth missing (living people)